Darwinia vestita, commonly known as pom-pom darwinia, is a species of flowering plant in the family Myrtaceae and is endemic to the southwest of Western Australia. It is an erect, bushy shrub with crowded egg-shaped, oblong, or linear leaves and more or less spherical heads of white to reddish-pink flowers.

Description
Flowering occurs from July to December.

Taxonomy
This species was first formally described in 1837 by Stephan Endlicher who gave it the name Genetyllis vestita in Enumeratio plantarum quas in Novae Hollandiæ ora austro-occidentali ad fluvium Cygnorum et in sinu Regis Georgii collegit Carolus Liber Baro de Hügel. In 1865, George Bentham changed the name to Darwinia vestita and published the change in the Journal of the Linnean Society, Botany. The specific epithet (vestita) means "clothed" or "covered", referring to the overlapping leaves in herbarium specimens.

Distribution and habitat
Darwinia vestita is found on stony hillsides, sandplains, granite outcrops, coastal areas and swamps in a wide area of the Avon Wheatbelt, Esperance Plains, Jarrah Forest, Mallee, Swan Coastal Plain and Warren bioregions of south-western Western Australia.

References

vestita
Endemic flora of Western Australia
Rosids of Western Australia
Myrtales of Australia
Plants described in 1837
Taxa named by Stephan Endlicher